The Continental Building, formerly Braly Block, is a 151 ft (46 m), 13-story high-rise residential building on Spring Street in the Historic Core of Los Angeles. The Continental Building is part of the Spring Street Financial District which is listed on the National Register of Historic Places.

When completed in 1903, it was the city's first high-rise building, and remained the tallest commercial building for fifty-three years. Shortly after the building was completed, the Los Angeles City Council enacted a 150 ft (46 m) height restriction on future buildings that remained until the 1950s.

The building was originally named after John Hyde Braly, the president of a business accredited with commissioning the building. Braly moved to Los Angeles in 1891 before eventually contributing to the erection of Braly Block.

Gallery

In popular culture
The building plays a prominent role in the 2009 independent film (500) Days of Summer.

See also

International Savings & Exchange Bank Building, 10-story structure built in the same area in 1907 and using the same architectural styles

References

Further reading

External links

Continental Building profile 

Buildings and structures in Downtown Los Angeles
Residential skyscrapers in Los Angeles
Residential condominiums in the United States
Los Angeles Historic-Cultural Monuments
Historic district contributing properties in California
National Register of Historic Places in Los Angeles
Office buildings completed in 1903
1903 establishments in California
1900s architecture in the United States
Beaux-Arts architecture in California